P. G. N. Unnithan (1898 – 5 April 1965) was the last Diwan (Prime Minister) of independent Travancore. He succeeded C. P. Ramaswami Iyer on 20 August 1947 following the latter's resignation (subsequent to the attempt on Iyer's life at the Swathi Thirunal Music Academy on 25 July 1947). He chaired the Travancore Constitutional Reforms Committee. He relinquished office on 24 March 1948 when people's government led by Pattom Thanu Pillai as Prime Minister took over.

Early life
P. G. N Unnithan hailed from the Edassery Pattaveettil Family of Mavelikkara which had a history of high military service to the Travancore Royal Family. His father Ittamar Koil Thampuran was from the Haripad Palace and nephew of Kerala Varma Valiya Koil Thampuran. He married Bhargavi Amma, the daughter of P. G. Govinda Pillai (Government advocate at Alappuzha) of Pullampilla Pichanattu (Viruthiyathu) Family of Chengannur, who was among the earliest women of the region to support the national movement starting with the boycott of foreign clothes at Alleppey organised and led by the veteran freedom fighter and P. G. N. Unnithan's classmate K. Kumar of Travancore. His sister was married to the son of famed Artist Raja Ravi Varma of the Royal Family of Mavelikkara. He had four children. He died on 5 April 1965.

Legacy
Unnithan Lane at Sasthamangalam in Thiruvananthapuram is named after him.

References

1898 births
1965 deaths
Diwans of Travancore
Indian Hindus
Politicians from Thiruvananthapuram
Malayali politicians